Vsemirny Trud (translated as World Labour) was a Russian science and literary monthly magazine published in Saint Petersburg in 1867–1872, with the average of 1500 subscribers. Its original publisher and editor-in-chief was Emmanuel Khan. Not long before the journal's closure, Stanislav Okreyts became its publisher and editor. In 1869 a literary supplement for it, Domashnyaya Biblioteka (Домашняя библиотека, Home Reading), was started. Among the authors whose work were published by Vsemirny Trud were Alexander Ostrovsky, Alexey Pisemsky, Pyotr Boborykin, Dmitry Averkiyev, Vasily Avenarius, Ivan Lazhechnikov, Vsevolod Krestovsky, Ivan Gensler, Daniil Mordovtsev, Alexander Milyukov, Mikhail Zagulyayev, Nikolai Solovyov, Nikolai Akhsharumov, Pyotr Petrov, Sergey Shubinsky, Vasily Kelsiyev.

On 29 June 1872 the magazine received a six-month suspension and after that never re-opened.

References 

1867 establishments in the Russian Empire
Defunct literary magazines published in Europe
Defunct magazines published in Russia
Magazines established in 1867
Magazines disestablished in 1872
Magazines published in Saint Petersburg
Literary magazines published in Russia
Monthly magazines published in Russia